Rafflesia speciosa is a parasitic plant species of the genus Rafflesia. It is endemic to the Philippine island of Panay. R. speciosa is the third Rafflesia species documented to exist in the Philippines, after R. manillana and R. schadenbergiana. It belongs to the medium-sized Rafflesia (Meijer, 1997). The species was named by Julie Barcelona and Edwino Fernando.

Rafflesia speciosa was discovered in the mountains of Sibalom Natural Park (particularly Mount Porras) in Antique, Panay by members of an outdoor club. It was adopted as the symbol of Sibalom Natural Park and the municipality of Sibalom. For more information, see the review of Philippine Rafflesia.

References

External links
 Parasitic Plant Connection: Rafflesia speciosa page

speciosa
Endemic flora of the Philippines
Flora of the Visayas
Plants described in 2002
Taxa named by Julie F. Barcelona